The James Mills House is a home in Savannah, Georgia, United States. It is located in the southeastern tything block of Oglethorpe Square and was built in 1855. It is part of the Savannah Historic District, and was built for James G. Mills, a commission merchant and factor. As of 1860, his office was at 200 Bay Street.

Historic Savannah Foundation saved the property from demolition around a century after its construction. In a survey for the foundation, Mary Lane Morrison found the building to be of significant status.

It is a detached sidehall townhouse, as is its neighbor to the west at 201–203 East York Street. It has a piazza on its eastern side.

See also
Buildings in Savannah Historic District

References

Houses in Savannah, Georgia
Houses completed in 1855
Oglethorpe Square (Savannah) buildings
Savannah Historic District